The 1994 Manchester Open was a men's tennis tournament played on outdoor grass courts. It was the fifth and final edition of the Manchester Open tennis tournament and was part of the ATP World Series of the 1994 ATP Tour. It took place from 13 June through 20 June 1994. Second-seeded Patrick Rafter won the singles title.

Finals

Singles

 Patrick Rafter defeated  Wayne Ferreira, 7–6(7–5), 7–6(7–4)
 It was Rafter's 1st singles title of his career.

Doubles

 Rick Leach /  Danie Visser defeated  Scott Davis /  Trevor Kronemann 6–4, 4–6, 7–6

References

External links
 ITF tournament edition details